Henan Wang (King/Prince of Henan) may refer to:

Shen Yang (Eighteen Kingdoms) ( 206/205 BC), ruler of Henan during the Qin–Han transition
Qifu Gangui (died 412), Western Qin ruler, reigned as King/Prince of Henan after 388
Qifu Chipan (died 428), Western Qin ruler, reigned as King/Prince of Henan after 411
Hou Jing (died 552), warlord during the Northern and Southern Dynasties period, briefly known as Prince of Henan in 547 during the Liang dynasty
Yang Zhao (584–606), Sui dynasty imperial prince, known as Prince of Henan from 590 to 601
Köke Temür (died 1375), late Yuan dynasty warlord, known as Prince of Henan from 1365 to 1368